John David Beckett Taylor, Baron Taylor of Warwick (born 21 September 1952) is a member of the House of Lords in the Parliament of the United Kingdom. His full title is "The Lord Taylor of Warwick". In 1996, at the age of 44, he became one of the youngest people in the upper house.

He is the third person of Afro-Caribbean origin to enter the House of Lords. Taylor initially practised as a barrister, and served as a part-time deputy district judge (magistrates' courts). Following the UK parliamentary expenses scandal he was sentenced to 12 months' imprisonment, relating to £11,277 in falsely claimed expenses, and was subsequently disbarred. He has also been a company director and television and radio presenter.

He is a Christian, who devotes time and resources to charities, namely Kidscape, Parents for Children, SCAR (Sickle Cell Anemia Relief), Variety Club Children's Charity of Great Britain, Warwick Leadership Foundation and WISCA (West Indian Senior Citizens' Association).

Early life
Born in 1952, Taylor was the son of Jamaican immigrants in Birmingham. His father, Derief Taylor, was a professional cricketer and coach for Warwickshire, and his mother, Enid, was a nurse. Taylor attended Moseley Grammar School in Birmingham where he was head boy, and later attended Keele University, where he studied English Literature and Law, followed by the Inns of Court School of Law in London.

Career

Legal
Taylor was called to the bar in 1978, by Gray's Inn, where he was also awarded the Gray's Inn Advocacy Award, and Norman Tapp Memorial Prize for excellence in mooting. Taylor undertook his pupillage at 1 Dr Johnson's Buildings, and then joined the same chambers as the future Justice Secretary, Ken Clarke. Taylor practised from there on the Midland & Oxford Circuit. In 1997, Taylor was appointed as a part-time district judge (Magistrates' Court). He was disbarred after his conviction and imprisonment related to the United Kingdom parliamentary expenses scandal.

Political
In the 1980s, Taylor turned to local politics and was elected to Solihull Council for the safe Conservative ward of St Alphege at a by-election in 1985 and was re-elected for a 4 year term in May 1988. He contested Birmingham Perry Barr for the Conservative Party at the 1987 general election, losing by 6,933 votes.  He was selected by Conservative Party's Central Office to become the Conservative candidate for Cheltenham at the 1992 general election. The campaign was seen as having been influenced by race, with Taylor's Caribbean background reportedly causing concern to some members of the local Conservative Party constituency association, which was completely split by the issue. Conservative Central Office expelled association members over the issue. John Major, then Prime Minister, campaigned for Taylor in Cheltenham, but he lost the seat to Nigel Jones of the Liberal Democrats by 1,668 votes, the first time since 1950 Cheltenham had not voted for a Conservative candidate and the first time since December 1910 it had voted for a Liberal-aligned candidate.

Taylor was made a life peer as Baron Taylor of Warwick, of Warwick in the County of Warwickshire on 2 October 1996, on the recommendation of Prime Minister John Major. At 44, he became one of the youngest life peers to sit in the House of Lords at the time.

Other activities 
In 2016, he appeared on the Fox News channel to discuss the potential impact of Britain leaving the European Union (Brexit).

Other positions he has held include:
 Television Presenter, Crime Stalker (Carlton Television); Talk About (BBC One); Powerhouse (Channel 4)
 Non-executive Director, Currencies Direct Ltd (resigned July 2010); Mottram Holdings PLC
 Consultant, Kleinwort Benson Bank
 Chancellor, Bournemouth University, 2001–2006.
 Vice President, National Small Business Bureau; British Board of Film Classification, 1998–2008.
 Member of the International Trade Council.
 Special Adviser to the Home Secretary and Home Office Ministers, 1990–1991.
 Founder of the Warwick Leadership Academy (2014 to present) providing services to young people.

False accounting convictions

In early 2009, a major political scandal was triggered by the leaking and subsequent publication of expense claims made by members of the United Kingdom Parliament. On 16 July 2010, Taylor resigned the Tory Whip after being charged with offences connected with claims totalling £11,277.

Several hundred members of the House of Commons and House of Lords were involved in the expenses scandal but only six members of the House of Commons and two, including Taylor, of the Lords, were charged and convicted.

Taylor's defence in the Crown Court was that on appointment to the House of Lords he had asked other peers for advice on expenses and allowances and that he was told that the overnight subsistence allowance, the office allowance, and the travel expenses were provided in lieu of a salary, as well as the daily attendance allowance. As a result of claiming for the cost of journeys he had not made, and the cost of accommodation he had not occupied, Taylor was convicted of six counts of false accounting.

In his summing up to the jury, Mr Justice Saunders observed that Taylor was a man of good character who had devoted a lot of time to helping others. The judge imposed a sentence of 12 months' imprisonment, relating to £11,277 in falsely claimed expenses; he also said that the expenses scandal had "left an indelible stain on Parliament". About 15 members of the House of Lords refused to give evidence to support Taylor's defence.

Personal life
Taylor married in 1981 and had three children with his wife. They divorced in 2005. The Daily Telegraph reported that Taylor is an evangelical Christian, and in 2009 he married an evangelical Christian from the US. That marriage lasted 24 days and was annulled in 2010. In 2015, Taylor married Laura Colleen Taylor, another US national.

References

External links
 
 BBC News profile
 TheyWorkForYou Profile
 Guardian Trial Coverage

1952 births
Living people
Alumni of Keele University
Alumni of the Inns of Court School of Law
Black British politicians
Politics of Cheltenham
Taylor of Warwick, John Taylor
English barristers
English people of Jamaican descent
People associated with Bournemouth University
People from Birmingham, West Midlands
People educated at Moseley School
English Protestants
Conservative Party (UK) parliamentary candidates
British politicians convicted of fraud
21st-century British criminals
Prisoners and detainees of England and Wales
British prisoners and detainees
Life peers created by Elizabeth II